Chiridopsis punctata is a species of leaf beetles belonging to the family Chrysomelidae.

Description
Disc is strongly convex. Elytra are black with faint green spots. They are surrounded by a yellowish line along the entire margins of the pronotal and elytral discs (in dried specimens such a line and the spots become reddish-brown). Head, ventrites, legs, and antennae are yellow. The most similar species is Chiridopsis rubromaculata, but it differs in colour of spots being red.

These beetles can be found in large number throughout the year, although their number in the winter months is slightly higher. The pupal stage takes place in June and last ten days. The main host plants are Argyreia species and, Ipomoea species (Convolvulaceae).

Distribution
This species is present in southern Asia, in Northeastern India, Southern China, Indonesia (Sumatra, Java), Malaysia (Borneo), Thailand and Vietnam.

References

 Weber, F., 1801. Observationes entomologicae, continents novorum quae condidit generum characteres, et nuper detectarum specierum descriptiones. Kiliae, 12+117 pp.
 Borowiec, L., 1999. A world catalogue of the Cassidinae (Coleoptera: Chrysomelidae). Biologica Silesiae, Wrocław, 476 pp.

External links
 Photo of Chiridopsis punctata (Weber, 1801)

Cassidinae
Beetles described in 1801
Beetles of Asia